KFDM (channel 6) is a television station in Beaumont, Texas, United States, affiliated with CBS, The CW Plus, and Fox. It is owned by Sinclair Broadcast Group, which provides certain services to Port Arthur–licensed Dabl affiliate KBTV-TV (channel 4) under joint sales and shared services agreements (JSA/SSA) with Deerfield Media. Both stations share studios at the I-10/US 69 (Eastex Freeway) interchange in Beaumont, while KFDM's transmitter is located in Vidor, Texas.

KFDM also previously served the Lake Charles, Louisiana, market as the market's default CBS station until KSWL-LD signed-on February 15, 2017 (especially since Lafayette affiliate KLFY-TV's coverage was severely crippled by its low-power digital signal on channel 10; KLFY's analog signal could easily cover Lake Charles).

History 
KFDM-TV commenced broadcasting on April 24, 1955, and is the oldest on-air TV station in the Beaumont–Port Arthur market. UHF TV channel 31 preceded KFDM by about a year, but went off the air less than a year after its sign on. For years, channel 6 billed itself as "the first television station on the right side of Texas." It was locally owned by Beaumont Broadcasting alongside KFDM (AM 560, now KLVI). The radio station was founded by the Magnolia Petroleum Company; the calls stood for "K(C)all for Dependable Magnolene," the brand name for Magnolia's motor oil line. Although KFDM radio was an affiliate of ABC Radio, channel 6 has always been a primary CBS affiliate with ABC and NBC programs. In 1957, NBC programming moved to KPAC-TV (channel 4) upon its opening broadcast. Channel 6 would become an exclusive CBS affiliate when ABC programming moved to the re-opened KBMT-TV on channel 12 in 1961. 

Original Chief Engineer Harold Bartlett, ham call sign W5KWA, oversaw all technical aspects of the station from its construction until his retirement in July 1980. His assistant, Richard Kihn, took over after Bartlett's retirement as acting Chief Engineer, and was appointed Chief Engineer on August 4, 1980. Kihn retired on October 26, 2012, and was replaced by Jim Hobbs. Hobbs did not last long and returned to radio engineering in Nebraska. Don Dobbs, former Director of Engineering at KTVT and KXAS-TV in Dallas–Fort Worth, took over as Director of Engineering at KFDM to oversee a major rebuild of the studios.

Beaumont Broadcasting sold KFDM radio in 1964 to John Hicks, father of Tom Hicks and brothers Steve and Jay. The callsign was changed to KLVI, which it remains today. However, channel 6 retained the "-TV" suffix until 2009, long after the two former sister stations went their separate ways. It held onto KFDM-TV until 1969, when it sold the station to A. H. Belo Corporation, earning a handsome return on its 1939 purchase of KFDM radio.

In 1983, Belo merged with Corinthian Broadcasting, owner of Houston's KHOU-TV. This raised concern with the Federal Communications Commission (FCC) on two fronts. KFDM-TV provided at least Grade B coverage to much of the Houston market's eastern portion, and city-grade coverage in some locations. At the time, the FCC normally did not allow common ownership of two stations with overlapping signals, and would not even consider a waiver for a city-grade overlap. The merger also put Belo over the FCC's limit of five VHF stations per owner. As a result, Belo sold KFDM-TV, along with WTVC in Chattanooga, Tennessee, to Freedom Communications in 1984.

In 1998, KFDM launched a charter The WB 100+ Station Group cable channel identified as "KWBB" to mimic a regular station's call sign. KFDM set up a separate sales department for KWBB.

From 2003 to 2006, the station carried programming from the United Paramount Network (UPN) as a secondary affiliation. In 2008, KFDM agreed to provide Southland Conference Television Network programming on Time Warner Cable Channel 35 starting on September 13. At the beginning of 2007, KFDM started broadcasting The CW on its second subchannel.

KFDM shut down its analog signal, over VHF channel 6, on June 12, 2009, the official date in which full-power television stations in the United States transitioned from analog to digital broadcasts under federal mandate. The station's digital signal remained on its pre-transition UHF channel 21. With the mandated shut down of the station's analog signal, the channel lost its ability for its audio to be transmit on radio channel 87.7. On April 7, 2010, the FCC issued a Report & Order, granting KFDM's channel change from channel 21 to channel 25. This was done because viewers in the eastern sections of the viewing area had difficulty receiving their signal on channel 21, due to the antenna issue and the fact that channel 20 was occupied by KLTL, the Louisiana Public Broadcasting (LPB) station in Lake Charles. On April 11, 2011, KFDM completed its move to channel 25 with higher power and a new omnidirectional antenna. Later tests showed the coverage was close to what KFDM had on analog channel 6, though forested areas had a weaker signal and poorer coverage.

Freedom Communications announced on November 2, 2011 that it would bow out of television and sell its stations, including KFDM, to Sinclair Broadcast Group. The deal made KFDM the fourth Sinclair-owned television property in the state of Texas and the first in Eastern Texas. Sinclair already owned KABB and KMYS in San Antonio and completed its purchase of Austin's KEYE-TV on January 3, 2012. Sinclair began operating KFDM under a time brokerage agreement from December 1, 2011 until the group deal was consummated on April 2, 2012.

On August 22, 2012, Nexstar Broadcasting Group filed with the FCC to sell its Fox affiliate KBTV-TV to Deerfield Media, a company also involved in Sinclair's acquisition of stations from Newport Television. Following the acquisition, KFDM took over operation of the station under a shared services agreement. The sale was completed on December 3.

The station began broadcasting Grit service on its .3 subchannel on December 29, 2014.

The facility housing KFDM and now KBTV was expanded in 2016 to accommodate both stations and modernize its facility. However, the stations will likely have to move in the near future, as the I-10/US 69 interchange will be expanded onto the footprint where those studios, along with the next-door facilities of iHeartMedia's East Texas cluster, currently sit, and Sinclair is currently in negotiations with TxDOT to sell its land. The company is likely to relocate the stations to a smaller facility, with actual production of the newscasts to be outsourced to Sinclair's San Antonio duopoly of WOAI-TV/KABB, along with associated attrition.

Fox 4 
On December 23, 2020, KFDM announced that the KBTV-TV Fox affiliation would move to KFDM-DT3 on February 1, 2021.

Programming

Syndicated programming
Syndicated programming on KFDM-DT1 includes The 700 Club, The Ellen DeGeneres Show, Dr. Phil, and Wheel of Fortune. Syndicated programming on KFDM-DT3 includes Divorce Court, Family Feud, and Jeopardy!, among others. The Beaumont area is one of the few markets to carry Wheel and Jeopardy! on separate broadcast streams.

News operation

The 1970s KFDM weekday news team consisted of Beaulieu, Burandt, weatherman Gary Powers, and sportscaster Cy Hurst. KFDM received an award from the Texas chapter of the Associated Press for their coverage of Hurricane Rita in 2005. KFDM also won a regional Emmy in 2006 for the same coverage.

Greg Bostwick has been with the station over 30 years and approximately twenty as chief meteorologist. He rode out Hurricane Rita in downtown Beaumont with weeknight anchor Bill Leger.

Former KFDM manager Larry Beaulieu joined the station in 1974 when he was hired as News Director. He teamed for over 15 years with Cecile Burandt, who was the first female anchor hired in the Beaumont area. Beaulieu retired on September 29, 2011, and was replaced the following December by longtime station employee Rix Garey.

In April 2011, KFDM became the second station in Southeast Texas after KBMT to broadcast its local newscasts in high definition.

Notable former on-air staff
 Sandra Bookman – weekend anchor (now at WABC-TV in New York City)
 Leeza Gibbons – co-host of PM Magazine

Subchannels
The station's digital signal is multiplexed:

References

External links 

KFDM-DT2 website
KFDM-DT3 website

Television channels and stations established in 1955
1955 establishments in Texas
CBS network affiliates
Fox network affiliates
Charge! (TV network) affiliates
FDM
Sinclair Broadcast Group